Ilaiyaraaja (born R. Gnanathesikan, 3 June 1943) is an Indian musician, composer, arranger, conductor, orchestrator, instrumentalist, lyricist and singer, popular for his works in Indian Cinema, prominently in Tamil & Telugu films. Reputed to be one of the most prolific Indian composers, in a career spanning over forty-five years, he has composed over 7,000 songs and provided film scores for over 1,000 films, apart from performing in over 20,000 concerts. Ilaiyaraaja is nicknamed "Isaignani" (the musical genius) and often referred to as "Maestro", the title conferred by the Royal Philharmonic Orchestra, London.

He was also one of the earliest Indian film composers to use Western classical music harmonies and string arrangements in Tamil film music, and the first South Asian to compose a full symphony. In 1986, he became the first Indian composer to record a soundtrack with computer for the film Vikram. He also composed Thiruvasagam in Symphony (2006), the first Indian oratorio.

In 2013, when CNN-IBN conducted a poll commemorating 100 years of Indian cinema, Ilaiyaraaja, secured 49% of the people's vote and was adjudged as the country's greatest music composer. In 2014, the American world cinema portal, "Taste of Cinema", placed him at 9th position in its list of 25 greatest film composers in the history of cinema, he's the only Indian in the list among names such as Ennio Morricone, John Williams and Jerry Goldsmith.

Ilaiyaraaja received  
several  awards for his works throughout his career. In 2012, for his creative and experimental works in the field of music, he received the Sangeet Natak Akademi Award, the highest Indian recognition given to people in the field of performing arts. In 2010, he was awarded the Padma Bhushan, the third-highest civilian honour in India; and was conferred the Padma Vibhushan in 2018, the second-highest civilian award by the government of India. He is a nominated Member of Parliament in the Indian upper house, Rajya Sabha, since July 2022.

Early life

Ilaiyaraaja was born as Gnanathesigan in a family belonging to Pannaipuram, in present-day Theni district, Tamil Nadu, India, on 3 June 1943. Ilaiyaraaja chose to celebrate his birthday on 2 June to leave 3 June entirely to Karunanidhi, the politician who called Ilaiyaraaja "Isaignani", 

At the time of joining school, his father changed his name from Gnanathesigan to "Rajaiya", and the people in his village called him "Raasayya". When he joined Dhanraj Master as a student to learn musical instruments, the master changed his name to "Raaja". While working for his first film Annakili, Tamil film producer Panchu Arunachalam added the prefix "Ilaiya" (Ilaiya meaning younger in Tamil language) to the name Raaja, and renamed him as "Ilaiyaraaja", as in the 1970s there was another popular music director with the same suffix, namely A. M. Rajah.

Initial exposure to music

Ilaiyaraaja grew up in a rural area and was exposed to a range of Tamil folk music in his formative years. At the age of 14, he joined a travelling musical troupe named as "Pavalar Brothers", headed by his elder brother Pavalar Varadharajan, and spent the next decade performing throughout Southern India. While working with the troupe, he penned his first composition, a musical adaptation of an elegy written by the Tamil poet laureate, Kannadasan for India's first prime minister, Jawaharlal Nehru.

In 1968, Ilaiyaraaja began a music course with Professor Dhanraj in Madras (now Chennai), the course included an overview of Western classical music, compositional training in techniques such as counterpoint, and study in instrumental performance. Ilaiyaraaja was a gold medalist in classical guitar after completing the course through distance learning channel from Trinity College of Music, London. He learnt carnatic music from T.V.Gopalakrishnan.

Career

Session musician and orchestrator
During 1970s in Chennai, Ilaiyaraaja played guitar in a band-for-hire, and worked as a session guitarist, keyboardist, and organist for film music composers and directors such as Salil Chowdhury from West Bengal. Chowdhury once said that Ilaiyaraaja is going to become the best composer in India. After being hired as the musical assistant to Kannada film composer G. K. Venkatesh, he worked on 200 film projects, mostly in Kannada cinema. As G. K. Venkatesh's assistant, Ilaiyaraaja would orchestrate the melodic outlines developed by Venkatesh. This is the time when Ilaiyaraaja learned the most about composing under the guidance of G. K. Venkatesh. During this period, Ilaiyaraaja also began writing his own scores. To listen to his compositions, he used to persuade Venkatesh's session musicians to play excerpts from his scores during their leisure times.

Film score composer

At the start of his career, the music sensibility of Ilaiyaraaja was very different to the film music being composed in those days, so he spent a lot of his time in learning, but "wasn’t able to grasp how music was being made for films." However in 1975, film producer Panchu Arunachalam, impressed by a song casually sung by Ilaiyaraaja, commissioned him to compose the songs and film score for a Tamil film titled Annakili (The Parrot). For the soundtrack, Ilaiyaraaja applied the techniques of modern popular film music orchestration  to Tamil folk poetry and folk song melodies, which resulted in creation of a fusion of Western and Tamil idioms. Initially he was little apprehensive about how his work would be received, and thought that musicians in the industry may write him off. Eventually, when Annakili released in 1976, the music became a huge hit. For his next following 12 films, Ilaiyaraaja based his compositions on the contemporary film music of the time, later when a new wave of films started to come, they opened the space for the kind of music he wanted to explore. 

Ilaiyaraaja's use of Tamil folk music in his film scores injected new life in the Indian film score milieu. By the mid-1980s, Ilaiyaraaja started gaining increasing stature as a composer and music director in the South Indian film industries. He has worked with Indian poets and lyricists such as Kannadasan, Vaali, Vairamuthu, O. N. V. Kurup, Sreekumaran Thampi, Veturi, Aacharya Aatreya, Sirivennela Sitaramasastri, Chi. Udaya Shankar and Gulzar, and became well known for his association with filmmakers such as Bharathiraja, S. P. Muthuraman, Mahendran, Balu Mahendra, K. Balachander, Mani Ratnam, Sathyan Anthikkad, Priyadarshan, Fazil, Vamsy, K. Viswanath, Singeetam Srinivasa Rao, Bala, Shankar Nag, and R. Balki.

Non-cinematic output
Ilaiyaraaja's first two non-film albums were explorations in the fusion of Indian and Western classical music. The first, How to Name It? (1986), is dedicated to the Carnatic master Tyāgarāja and to J. S. Bach. It features a fusion of the Carnatic form and ragas with Bach partitas, fugues and Baroque musical textures. The second, Nothing But Wind (1988), was performed by flautist Hariprasad Chaurasia and a 50-piece orchestra and takes the conceptual approach suggested in the title—that music is a "natural phenomenon akin to various forms of air currents".

He has composed a set of Carnatic kritis which were recorded by electric mandolinist U. Srinivas for the album Ilayaraaja's Classicals on the Mandolin (1994). Ilaiyaraaja has also composed albums of religious/devotional songs. His Guru Ramana Geetam (2004) is a cycle of prayer songs inspired by the Hindu mystic Ramana Maharshi, and his Thiruvasakam: A crossover (2005) is an oratorio of ancient Tamil poems transcribed partially in English by American lyricist Stephen Schwartz and performed by the Budapest Symphony Orchestra. Ilaiyaraaja's most recent release is a world music-oriented album called The Music Messiah (2006).

He has announced on his birthday that his ‘Isai OTT’ application will be launched soon and promised the app will contain much more than just his songs, like behind-the-scenes trivia about how each of his songs were conceived, produced, delivered and collaborations with other musicians.

Musical style and sensibility

Ilaiyaraaja, once reflecting over his works ahead of turning seventy-five, said his "life experiences and learning" have been the fount from which his musical output poured, but sometimes felt that some of his compositions transcended them as if they were, "the reflection of the efforts of past lives — mine, or those of other musical exponents." When enquired if it was anyway similar to the case of mathematical genius, Srinivasa Ramanujan, who insisted he received math formula in dreams from a goddess, Ilaiyaraaja said that unlike Ramanujan who felt a supernatural being guiding him, he always felt a moment of clarity when a composition came to his mind, "It is as if I am the subject and the object of art at the same time when that happens," he said.

Ilaiyaraaja's musical style is characterised by an orchestration which is a synthesis of Indian folk music and Western classical music, with traditional Indian instruments and modes. He uses electronic music technology that integrates synthesizers, electric guitars and keyboards, drum machines, rhythm boxes and MIDI with large orchestras that feature traditional instruments such as the veena, venu, nadaswaram, dholak, mridangam and tabla as well as Western lead instruments such as saxophones and flutes.

The basslines in his songs tend to be melodically dynamic, rising and falling in a dramatic fashion. Polyrhythms are also apparent, particularly in songs with Indian folk or Carnatic influences. The melodic structure of his songs demand considerable vocal virtuosity, and have found expressive platform amongst some of India's respected vocalists and playback singers, such as T. M. Soundararajan, S. Janaki, P. Susheela, K. J. Yesudas, K. S. Chithra, S. P. Balasubrahmanyam, M. G. Sreekumar, Rajkumar, Asha Bhosle, Lata Mangeshkar, Jayachandran, Uma Ramanan, S. P. Sailaja, Jency, Swarnalatha, Minmini, Sujatha, Malaysia Vasudevan, Kavita Krishnamurthy, Hariharan, Suresh Wadkar, Udit Narayan, Sadhana Sargam and Shreya Ghoshal. Ilaiyaraaja has sung more than 400 of his own compositions for films, and is recognisable by his stark, deep voice. He has penned the lyrics for some of his songs in Tamil. It is widely believed that he is the only composer in the world to have composed a song only in the ascending notes. He considers M. S. Viswanathan as an overwhelming influence on his music.

Ilaiyaraaja is nicknamed "Isaignani" (the musical genius), a title conferred by Kalaignar Karunanidhi. He is often referred to as "maestro", the title conferred by the Royal Philharmonic Orchestra, London. He was one of the earliest Indian film composers to use Western classical music harmonies and string arrangements in Indian film music. This allowed him to craft a rich tapestry of sounds for films, and his themes and background score gained notice and appreciation among Indian film audiences. The range of expressive possibilities in Indian film music was broadened by Ilaiyaraaja's methodical approach to arranging, recording technique, and his drawing of ideas from a diversity of musical styles. 

He is reputed to be the world's most prolific composer having composed more than 7,000 songs, provided film scores for more than 1,000 movies and performed in more than 20,000 concerts. In 1993, he became the first Indian to compose a full symphony, performed by the Royal Philharmonic Orchestra, London and is also known to have written the entire symphony in less than a month. Composed by Ilaiyaraaja, the critically acclaimed Thiruvasagam in Symphony (2006) is the first Indian oratorio.

According to musicologist P. Greene, Ilaiyaraaja's "deep understanding of so many different styles of music allowed him to create syncretic pieces of music combining very different musical idioms in unified, coherent musical statements". Ilaiyaraaja has composed Indian film songs that amalgamated elements of genres such as Afro-tribal, bossa nova, dance music (e.g., disco), doo-wop, flamenco, acoustic guitar-propelled Western folk, funk, Indian classical, Indian folk/traditional, jazz, march, pathos, pop, psychedelia and rock and roll.

By virtue of this variety and his intermingling of Western, Indian folk and Carnatic elements, Ilaiyaraaja's compositions appeal to the Indian rural dweller for its rhythmic folk qualities, the Indian classical music enthusiast for the employment of Carnatic Ragas, and the urbanite for its modern, Western-music sound. Ilaiyaraaja's sense of visualisation for composing music is always to match up with the story line of the running movie and possibly by doing so, he creates the best experience for the audience to feel the emotions flavoured through his musical score. He mastered this art of blending music to the narration, which very few others managed to adapt themselves over a longer time. Although Ilaiyaraaja uses a range of complex compositional techniques, he often sketches out the basic melodic ideas for films in a very spontaneous fashion.

Honours and legacy 

Ilaiyaraaja has been awarded five National Film Awards—three for Best Music Direction and two for Best Background Score. In 2010, he was awarded the Padma Bhushan, the third-highest civilian honour in India and the Padma Vibhushan in 2018, the second-highest civilian award by the government of India. In 2012, he received the Sangeet Natak Akademi Award, the highest Indian recognition given to practising artists, for his creative and experimental works in the music field. He is a gold medalist in classical guitar from Trinity College of Music, London, Distance Learning Channel.

In 2003, according to an international poll conducted by BBC of more than half-a million people from 165 countries, his composition "Rakkamma Kaiya Thattu" from the 1991 film Thalapathi was voted fourth in the top 10 most popular songs of all time.

In 2013, when the Indian news channel CNN-IBN conducted a poll commemorating 100 years of Indian cinema, Ilaiyaraaja, secured 49% of the people's vote and was adjudged as the country's greatest music composer, A. R. Rahman, stood second with 29% vote. 

In 1986, he became the first Indian composer to record a soundtrack with computer for the film Vikram. He was also one of the earliest Indian film composers to use Western classical music harmonies and string arrangements in Tamil film music, and the first South Asian to compose a full symphony. He also composed Thiruvasagam in Symphony (2006), the first Indian oratorio.

According to Achille Forler, board member of the Indian Performing Right Society, the kind of stellar body of work that Ilaiyaraaja has created in the last 40 years should have placed him among the world's top 10 richest composers, somewhere between Andrew Lloyd Webber ($1.2 billion) and Mick Jagger (over $300 million).

On 6 July 2022, he has been nominated to the Rajya Sabha as Member of parliament by the President of India, Ram Nath Kovind.

Personal life 

Ilaiyaraaja was married to Jeeva and the couple has three children—Karthik Raja, Yuvan Shankar Raja and Bhavatharini—all film composers and singers. His wife Jeeva died on 31 October 2011. Ilaiyaraaja's brother, Gangai Amaran, is also a music director and lyricist in the Tamil film industry, and both were not in talking terms for 13 years.

Snippets

Ilaiyaraaja uses his same old harmonium, whether in a studio, or in a concert. He has scored with it throughout his career, curiously in his younger days, he was never allowed to touch it by his brother who thought he would spoil it. However Ilaiyaraaja would play with it whenever he wasn't there, "that’s how I learnt how to play," he says "the harmonium knows that it was made for me. It tells me that there is more music to be made."
One of the earliest admirers of Ilaiyaraaja, Bengali composer Salil Choudhury, under whose tutelage Ilaiyaraaja initially worked as a lead guitarist, once remarked, "Our main guitarist in Madras is the best composer in India".
British Musician Andy Votel, described Ilaiyaraaja in an essay thus, "Whatever "genre" of music you choose to like/ love/ promote/ protect/ politicise/ over-intellectualize/ despise/ defend or pretend to enjoy, Ilaiyaraaja has done it."
Director R. K. Selvamani claimed that for his film Chembaruthi (1992), Ilaiyaraaja had composed nine songs in just 45 minutes, which is a record.
Cinematographer Santosh Sivan said that Ilaiyaraaja finished composing for the entire soundtrack of the movie Thalapathi in less than "half a day".
During the recording for the song "Sundari" from the movie Thalapathi in Mumbai with R.D. Burman's orchestra, when Ilaiyaraaja gave them the notes, they were so moved and taken in by the composition that all the musicians put their hands together in awe and gave a standing ovation as a mark of respect for Ilaiyaraaja.
Actor Rajnikanth noted that Ilaiyaraaja used to complete the re-recording of three films in a single day, without any sleep; while present generation composers take 30 days for a single film.
Carnatic vocalist T. M. Krishna considers no other film composer has displayed the broad range of understanding music like Ilaiyaraaja, and the way he adapts and creates music is unfathomable making him the absolute master.
The score and soundtrack of the 1984 Malayalam-language film My Dear Kuttichathan, the first stereoscopic 3D film made in India, was composed by him.
He composed the soundtrack for the movie Nayakan (1987), an Indian film ranked by Time magazine as one of the all-time 100 best movies
The soundtrack of Thalapathi was included in The Guardians 100 Albums to Hear Before You Die.
In 2003, according to an international poll conducted by BBC, more than half-a million people from 165 countries voted his composition Rakkamma Kaiya Thattu from the 1991 film Thalapathi as fourth in the world's top 10 most popular songs of all time.
Ilaiyaraaja's song 'Naanthaan Ungappanda' from the 1981 film 'Ram Lakshman' was part of the playlist for the opening ceremony of the 2012 Summer Olympics.
The Illaiyaraaja compositions Paayum Puli Title Music and Ilamai Itho were part of the soundtrack of Ashim Ahluwalia’s 2012 Cannes Film Festival entry, Miss Lovely.
The Lovebirds (2020) incorporates a section of Ilaiyaraaja's "Oru kili" soundtrack composed for the movie Aanandha Kummi (1983) as background music in its official trailer.
 In May 2020, he composed a song titled Bharath Bhoomi, as tribute to the people working amid COVID-19 pandemic. The song was crooned by S. P Balasubrahmanyam and the video of the song was unveiled by Ilaiyaraaja on his YouTube channel on 30 May 2020, in Tamil and Hindi.
The Black Eyed Peas sampled the Ilaiyaraaja composition "Unakkum Ennakum" from Sri Raghavendra (1985), for the song "The Elephunk Theme" in Elephunk (2003).
Popular American rapper Meek Mill sampled one of Ilaiyaraaja's hit songs for Indian Bounce.
His song "Mella Mella Ennaithottu" from Vaazhkai was sampled by Rabbit Mac in the song Sempoi.
The alternative artist M.I.A. sampled "Kaatukuyilu" from the film Thalapathi (1991) for her song "Bamboo Banga" on the album Kala (2007).
Alphant sampled Ilaiyaraaja's music for his song An Indian Dream.
Gonjasufi sampled Ilaiyaraaja's "Yeh Hawa Yeh Fiza" from the movie Sadma.

Live performances

Ilaiyaraaja rarely performs his music live. His first major live performance since his debut was a four-hour concert held at the Jawaharlal Nehru Indoor Stadium in Chennai, India on 16 October 2005. He performed in 2004 in Italy at the Teatro Comunale di Modena, an event-concert presented for the 14th edition of Angelica, Festival Internazionale Di Musica, co-produced with the L'Altro Suono Festival.

On 23 October 2005, "A Time For Heroes", sponsored by different agencies including the Melinda and Bill Gates Foundation, saw Hollywood star Richard Gere, Tamil and Telugu stars converging on the city for an evening of "infotainment"—they spoke in one voice on HIV/AIDS.
The event organised at the Gachibowli Indoor Stadium, Hyderabad, on Saturday, 22 October 2005, took off with maestro Ilaiyaraaja's composition rendered by singer Usha Uthup.

A television retrospective titled Ithu Ilaiyaraja ("This is Ilaiyaraja") was produced, chronicling his career. He last performed live at the audio release function of the film Dhoni and before that, he performed a programme that was conducted and telecasted by Jaya TV titled Enrendrum Raja ("Everlasting Raja") on 28 December 2011, at Jahawarlal Nehru Indoor Stadium, Chennai. On 23 September 2012, he performed live in Bangalore at National High School Grounds.

On 16 February 2013, Ilayaraja made his first appearance in North America performing at the Rogers Centre in Toronto, Canada. The Toronto concert was promoted by Trinity Events for Vijay TV in India and produced by Sandy Audio Visual SAV Productions with PA+. Following his show at Toronto, Ilaiyaraaja also performed at the Prudential Center Newark, New Jersey on 23 February 2013, and at the HP Pavilion at San Jose on 1March 2013. After his North America tour he made a live performance at The O2 Arena in London on 24 August 2013, along with Kamal Haasan and his sons Yuvan Shankar Raja and Karthik Raja.

Ilaiaraaja and his team performed live in North America in 2016. In October 2017, he performed live for the first time in Hyderabad and in November in Kuala Lumpur, Malaysia. In March 2018, he performed live again in Houston, Dallas, Chicago, San Jose, Connecticut, Washington D.C. and Toronto.

For the first time in his career, Ilaiyaraaja has performed in Sydney with his orchestra in Hillsong Convention Centre on 11 August 2018. Also, in the same month as to celebrate his 75th birth anniversary, a concert was held in Singapore Star Performing Arts Theatre on 18 August.

Ilaiyaraaja organised a concert titled Isai Celebrates Isai in Chennai as a part of his 76th birthday celebration on 2 June 2019. Usually the maestro's team consists of forty to fifty musicians, but for the first time ever the concert had close to a hundred artists sharing the stage. The four-hour live concert also saw the reunion of noted singer S. P. Balasubrahmanyam after their fallout over royalties in 2017. The event was an effort to raise funds for Cine Musicians Association.

For the first time, Isaignani Ilaiyaraaja hosted a live concert in Coimbatore on 9 June 2019. Titled Rajathi Raja, the event was held at the Codissia Grounds. Along with Ilaiyaraaja, singers SPB, Mano, Usha Uthup, Haricharan, Madhu Balakrishnan, and Bavatharini also performed at the event, backed by an orchestra from Hungary. Latha Rajinikanth and her daughter Aishwarya were also part of the event. The proceeds from the concert were donated to Peace for Children, an NGO that the former runs.

For the first time, Isaignani Ilaiyaraaja will be performing in Europe, 1st July in Germany and the 2nd July in France. Titled Ilaiyaraaja 80. Along with Ilaiyaraaja, singers Sheweta Mohan, Karthik, Mano, Madhu Balakrishnan, S.P.Charan and Surmukhi Raman.

Legal issues and controversies

In 2017, claiming copyright violations, Ilaiyaraaja sent legal notices to singers, S. P Balasubrahmanyam, his son S. P. Charan and Chithra, prohibiting them from singing his compositions without his consent, and warned they would have to pay huge royalties and face legal action if they do so. Ilaiyaraaja's brother Gangai Amaran criticized him, saying legal notice to SPB is 'foolishness'.

In 2018, during a talk show in the US, Ilaiyaraaja expressed his doubts regarding the credibility of the Christian belief in the Resurrection of Jesus Christ, and claimed that resurrection happened only in the case of the Hindu saint Ramana Maharshi. In protest, a Christian group lodged a complaint with the Police Commissioner of Trichy, demanding an apology or police action against Ilaiyaraaja for raising doubt about the "ultimate belief of Christians".

In early 2022, talking about the state of music composers in industry, Ilaiyaraaja said, "There are no composers in the film industry today; there are only programmers."

In April 2022, Ilaiyaraaja triggered a controversy by writing a foreword in the book titled, "Ambedkar & Modi — Reformer’s Ideas", in which he praised the Prime Minister Narendra Modi, and compared him to B.R. Ambedkar.
When he received some criticism, leaders from BJP came to his support.

Ilaiyaraaja discography

See also
 List of songs recorded by Ilaiyaraaja

References

Further reading

Prem-Ramesh. 1998 Ilaiyaraja: Isaiyin Thathuvamum Alagiyalum (trans.: Ilaiyaraja: The Philosophy and Aesthetics of Music). Chennai: Sembulam.
Ilaiyaraaja. 1998 Vettaveli Thanil Kotti Kidakkuthu (trans.: My Spiritual Experiences) (3rd ed.). Chennai: Kalaignan Pathipagam. → A collection of poems by Ilaiyaraaja
Ilaiyaraaja. 1998 Vazhithunai. Chennai: Saral Veliyeedu.
Ilaiyaraaja. 1999 Sangeetha Kanavugal (trans.: Musical Dreams) (2nd ed.). Chennai: Kalaignan Pathipagam. → An autobiography about Ilaiyaraaja's European tour and other musings.
Ilaiyaraaja. 2000 Ilaiyaraajavin Sinthanaigal (trans.: Ilaiyaraaja's Thoughts). Chennai: Thiruvasu Puthaka Nilayam.

External links

 
Best Music Direction National Film Award winners
Best Background Score National Film Award winners
Living people
Recipients of the Padma Bhushan in arts
Recipients of the Sangeet Natak Akademi Award
Tamil playback singers
Tamil film score composers
Tamil musicians
Telugu film score composers
Kannada film score composers
Kerala State Film Award winners
Malayalam film score composers
Alumni of Trinity College of Music
20th-century Indian musicians
20th-century classical composers
21st-century classical composers
Indian male singers
Musicians from Chennai
Indian Tamil people
Telugu playback singers
Indian composers of Western classical music
Kannada playback singers
Tamil Nadu State Film Awards winners
Filmfare Awards South winners
Nandi Award winners
1943 births
People from Theni district
Indian male playback singers
Indian male musicians
Recipients of the Padma Vibhushan in arts
Indian male film score composers
Pianist from India
Nominated members of the Rajya Sabha